In the Shadow of the Living Room is the debut and only studio album by American alternative hip hop duo Reaching Quiet consisting of Yoni Wolf and Odd Nosdam. It was released on Mush Records in 2002. 

The songs "Broken Crow" and "Me And The Pea Coat" would later reappear on the 2003 tour and companion live album "Almost Live From Anna's Cabin" of chief songwriter Yoni Wolf's band WHY? with different instrumentation and structure.

Critical reception
Jason Nickey of AllMusic gave the album 4 stars out of 5, calling it "a surrealistic collage-style hip-hop symphony." In 2008, the track "Broken Crow" was listed by The A.V. Club as one of the "25 Sad Songs for Changing Seasons".

Track listing

References

External links
 

2002 debut albums
Mush Records albums
Reaching Quiet albums